Shauna Aminath (born 1985) is a Maldivian politician.  She has served as Minister of the Environment, Climate Change, and Technology since May 2021.

Early life 
Shauna Aminath is a native of the Maldives. Aminath began activism in the ninth grade, where she spoke out against government policies in a school debate. She attended Pearson College UWC in Victoria, British Columbia, Canada, for two years and earned her bachelor's degree from Westminster College in Fulton, Missouri in 2008. She worked for former president Mohamed Nasheed and is now president and policy secretary of the Maldivian Democratic Party youth wing. She returned to the Maldives.

Government work 
Aminath worked as Nasheed's deputy undersecretary. During his presidential term, the government worked to show the world how much climate change and the sea level rise would effect the Maldives.

The military forced Nasheed to resign on February 7, 2012, in a coup d'état. Aminath constructed a statement after the president's resignation stating her concern and called for a new, free election. This caused uproar with the opposing party vying for control of the country. Aminath was arrested on September 17, 2012. She was released five days later upon the conditions that she not participate in protests for the next twenty one days. Aminath was arrested on several other occasions due to police forces trying to break up peaceful demonstrations and rallies.

Minister of the Environment, Climate Change, and Technology, 2021–present
In May 2021, Aminath was appointed Minister of the Environment, Climate Change, and Technology for the Maldives.

Aminath, along with Teresa Ribera, led the working group at the 2022 United Nations Climate Change Conference that facilitated consultations on mitigation.

Activism 
Aminath works for the Maldivian Democratic party as president of the youth wing and to return the party to power. She is active in voicing her concerns for her country and climate change. She is involved with many organizations that aid the global refugee issue. Some of her work can be seen in the documentary The Island President, which follows the story of former president Nasheed.

References

Living people
1985 births
21st-century Maldivian women politicians
21st-century Maldivian politicians
People educated at a United World College
Westminster College (Missouri) alumni
Government ministers of the Maldives
Maldivian Democratic Party politicians